Haloxazolam (marketed in Japan under the brand name Somelin), is a drug which is a benzodiazepine derivative. It has similar hypnotic properties as the benzodiazepine drugs triazolam, temazepam, and flunitrazepam and as such is indicated for the treatment of insomnia. A study in cats comparing estazolam and haloxazolam found that haloxazolam only affects gamma motor neurons, whereas estazolam affects both alpha and gamma motor neurons.

See also 
Benzodiazepine

References 

GABAA receptor positive allosteric modulators
Lactams
Bromoarenes
Fluoroarenes
Oxazolobenzodiazepines